Demetrios Kokkidis (Greek:Δημήτριος Κοκκίδης; November 4, 1840 - February 11, 1896) was an astronomer, mathematician, physicist, professor, and dean.  Kokkidis was the fourth president of the Athens Observatory after the death of Johann Friedrich Julius Schmidt.  He was one of the few Greek astronomers of the 20th century following Georgios Konstantinos Vouris and Ioannis Papadakis.  He did extensive research and wrote articles about Mercury, the Sun, the Moon, and various meteorological phenomena.

Demetrios was born in Athens.  His father was Greek War Hero Kosmas Kokkidis.  Kosmas also taught at Evelpidon and Demetri's brother Ifikratis Kokkidis was a prominent military engineer.  From a young age, Demetrios showed signs of higher intelligence and attracted the attention of Greek entrepreneur and philanthropist Simon Sinas.  Demetrios studied astronomy at the University of Berlin and the Berlin Observatory under the supervision of Johann Franz Encke.  His dissertation in 1862 was entitled  Variations of the Declinations of the Stars θ Ursa Major and β Draco (Variationibus Declinationum Stellarum θ Ursae Majoris et β Draconis). Demetrios also studied in Paris until 1877.
   
He returned to Greece and taught at three different institutions while writing for two publications Parnassos and Estia.  He briefly served as Dean of the Philosophical School which was part of the University of Athens.  For his distinguished contribution to the field of astronomy, he was awarded the Order of the Redeemer from Greece. He also received similar awards from Spain and Prussia.  He died in Athens in 1896 at 55 years old.

History
Kokkidis was born in Athens.  He was from a prestigious academic family.  His mother's name was Fani and his father's name was Kosmas Kokkidis.  Kosmas fought in the Greek War of Independence and eventually became a professor at Evelpidon.  Demetri's brother Ifikratis Kokkidis was also a soldier and a professor at Evelpidon.  
In October 1850, Demetrios attended the southern junior high school, and three years later in September 1853, he was accepted at the first royal high school of Athens.  One of his professors was physicist and mathematician Athanasios Kyzikinos. Demetrios graduated with high honors in June 1858.  Because he was an extraordinary student he attracted the attention of Greek philanthropist and royalist Simon Sinas.  Sinas and his father Georgios Sinas were responsible for erecting the National Observatory of Athens.  Both figures were associated with Greek astronomers Georgios Konstantinos Vouris and Johann Friedrich Julius Schmidt.  Demetrios chose to study astronomy at the University of Berlin and the Berlin Observatory. His professor was world-renowned astronomer Johann Franz Encke; Demetrios was also affiliated with Karl Christian Bruhns while he was at the Observatory.  He completed a dissertation in 1862 entitled: Variations of the Declinations of the Stars θ Ursa Major and β Draco (Variationibus Declinationum Stellarum θ Ursae Majoris et β Draconis) afterward he continued his studies in Paris until 1877 occasionally returning to Greece.

He permanently returned to Greece and was appointed curator of the Athens observatory on April 16, 1877. On March 30, 1881, he became a professor of astronomy at the University of Athens teaching geography, astronomy, meteorology, climatology, and mathematics.  Demetrios also taught geodesics, astronomy, and higher mathematics at Evelpidon and the Hellenic Naval Academy following the footsteps of his father Kosmas.  World-renowned Greek-German astronomer Johann Friedrich Julius Schmidt died in 1884.  Kokkidis assumed his role as director of the Athens Observatory becoming the fourth director.  During his tenure, he wrote countless articles in the field of astronomy and expanded the existing weather stations adding ones in Corfu, Zakynthos, and Larissa.  He became dean of the Philosophical School in the academic year 1887-1888 which was part of the University of Athens.

He worked tirelessly to strengthen relations between the Athens Observatory and its international counterparts.  He received the Order of the Redeemer from the Greek state and similar awards from Spain and Prussia for his contribution to astronomy.  From 1840 to 1869 he was a consultant for the Athens Archaeological Society.  He wrote for the publication Estia. Demetrios became a member of the scientific division of Parnassos Literary Society in 1870. The organization also featured a publication.  The Parnassos club is now housed in a private mansion on St. George Square designed by his brother Ifikratis Kokkidis.

Literary Works

References

Bibliography

19th-century Greek mathematicians
19th-century Greek educators
19th-century Greek scientists
19th-century Greek astronomers
Greek astronomers
Greek meteorologists
Academic staff of the National and Kapodistrian University of Athens
University of Paris alumni
Scientists from Athens
Writers from Athens
1840 births
1896 deaths